The Garzan oil field is an oil field located in Batman, Batman Province, Southeastern Anatolia Region. It was discovered in 1947–1951 and developed by Türkiye Petrolleri Anonim Ortaklığı. It began production in 1956. The structure is a double plunging anticline bordered by a major reverse fault extending along the southern flank. The age of the Garzan formation is cretaceous, consisting of carbonates of a rudist build-up complex. Oil field contains 24 degree API (0.91 g/cm3) oil with a reservoir viscosity of 6.75 cp. Reservoir was initially highly undersaturated lists basic reservoirdata for Garzan.

References

Oil fields in Turkey
Buildings and structures in Batman Province
Geography of Batman Province